Hwang Sok-yong (born January 4, 1943) is a South Korean novelist.

Life
Hwang was born in Hsinking (today Changchun), Manchukuo, during the period of Japanese rule.  His family returned to Korea after liberation in 1945.  He later obtained a bachelor's degree in philosophy from Dongguk University(동국대학교).

Hwang has been an avid reader of a wide range of literature and he wanted to become a writer since childhood.

In 1964 he was jailed for political reasons and met labor activists. Upon his release he worked at a cigarette factory and at several construction sites around the country.

In 1966~1969 he was part of the Republic of Korea Marine Corps during the Vietnam War, reluctantly fighting for the American cause that he saw as an attack on a liberation struggle:

In Vietnam he was responsible for "clean-up," erasing the proof of civilian massacres and burying the dead. A gruesome experience in which he was constantly surrounded by corpses that were gnawed by rats and abuzz with flies. Based on these experiences he wrote the short story "The Pagoda" in 1970, which won the daily newspaper Chosun Ilbo's new year prize, and embarked on an adult literary career.

His first novel Mr. Han's Chronicle, the story of a family separated by the Korean War, was published in 1970. The novel is still topical today after Kim Dae-jung's visit to North Korea and meeting with Kim Jong-il led to reunion programs for separated families, and talk of reunification. Mr. Han's Chronicle was translated into French by Zulma in 2002.

Hwang Sok-yong published a collection of stories, On the Road to Sampo in 1974, and became a household name with his epic, Jang Gilsan, which was serialized in a daily newspaper over a period of ten years (1974?84). Using the parable of a bandit from olden  times ("parables are the only way to foil the censors") to describe the contemporary dictatorship, Chang Kil-san was a huge success in North as well as South Korea. It sold an estimated million copies, and remains a bestseller in Korea fiction today.

Hwang Sok-yong also wrote for the theatre, and several members of a company were killed while performing one of his plays during the 1980 Kwangju uprising. During this time Hwang Sok-yong went from being a politically committed writer revered by students and intellectuals, to participating directly in the struggle. As he says:

The 1985 appearance of Lee Jae-eui's book Beyond Death, Beyond the Darkness of Age (English translation: Kwangju Diary: Beyond Death, Beyond the Darkness of Age, 1999) brought new trouble: Hwang Sok-yong originally agreed to take credit as the author in order to help market the book, and both Hwang as the assumed author and the publisher were arrested and sent to prison. Hwang Sok-yong's substantial and award-winning novel based on his bitter experience of the Vietnam War, The Shadow of Arms was published in 1985. It would be translated into English in 1994 and French in 2003. In 1989 Hwang Sok-yong traveled to Pyongyang in North Korea, via Tokyo and Beijing, as a representative of the nascent democratic movement:

Rather than return to South Korea he went into voluntary exile in New York, lecturing at Long Island University. He also spent time in Germany, which he found transformational.

In 1993 he returned to Seoul because "a writer needs to live in the country of his mother tongue" and was promptly sentenced to seven years in prison for breach of national security. While in prison, he conducted eighteen hunger strikes against restrictions such as the banning of pens, and inadequate nutrition.

Organizations around the world, including PEN America and Amnesty, rallied for his release and the author was finally pardoned in 1998 as part of a group amnesty by the then newly elected president Kim Dae-jung. When asked whether the regime that had freed him, recognized his work and even sent him on an official visit to North part of a policy of opening up and promoting dialogue was a democracy, he replied:

Hwang Sok-yong published his next novel, The Old Garden, in 2000. It was published in German in Fall 2005 by DTV, French by Zulma. The English-language edition, called The Old Garden, was published in September 2009 by Seven Stories Press, and was published subsequently in England by Picador Asia under the title The Ancient Garden. The early chapters of the book are currently being serialized online.

The Guest, a novel about a massacre in North Korea wrongly attributed to the Americans that had in fact been carried out by Christian Koreans, was published in 2002. It would be translated into French in 2004 and Seven Stories brought out the English-language edition to critical acclaim in 2005. The "guest" is a euphemism for smallpox, or an unwanted visitor that brings death and destruction.

In December 2013, Seven Stories will publish his latest novel, titled The Shadow of Arms. A novel based on the author's experience in Korea's military corps fighting America's war in Vietnam, it reveals the regional economic motivations for the conflict within the larger Cold War.

Work
Hwang defined the reality of Korea as a "national-wide state of homelessness," and has continuously explored the psychology of the people who have lost their "homes," symbolic or real. "Home," to Hwang Sok-yong, is not simply a place where you were born and raised but a community life rooted in the feeling of solidarity. This idea of home is also the basis for Hwang's attempt to reveal social contradictions through peripheral or foreign people. Hwang's literary tendencies are strongly linked on his personal experiences. "For the Little Brother' (Aureul wihayeo, 1972), "The Light of Twilight" (Noeurui bit, 1973) and "Passionate Relationship" (Yeorae, 1988) are the stories of the author's adolescence, which embraces issues such as rejections of one's parents, hatred of competition, and the feeling of humanity and solidarity shared by the people at the periphery of the society.

Hwang's work can be divided into three categories. The first deals with the loss of humanity and devastation of life due to modernization, war, and the military system; The second category expresses the desire to reclaim healthy life and rejuvenate damaged values and; the third are in the category of historical novel.

Works in translation
 At Dusk (Scribe, 2018)
 Familiar Things (Scribe UK, 2017)
 Princess Bari (Periscope, 2015)
 The Shadow Of Arms (Seven Stories, 2014)
 The Old Garden (Seven Stories Press, 2012)
 The Ancient Garden (Pan Macmillan Hardback, 2009)
 The Guest (Seven Stories, 2006)
 "A Dream of Good Fortune" (1973, translated in the anthology Land of Exile: Contemporary Korean Fiction)

Works in Korean (Partial)
 Strange Land (Gaekji, 1971)
 Mr. Han's Chronicle (Hanssi yeondaegi, 1972)
 On the Road to Sampo (Sampo ganeun gil, 1973)
 Dream of a Hercules (Jangsaui kkum, 1974)
 The Shadow of Arms (Mugiui geuneul, 1985)
 The Ancient Garden (Oraedoen jeongwon, 2000)
 The Guest (Sonnim, 2001)
 The Children of Moraenmal (Moraenmal aideul 2001)
 Simcheong, The Lotus Path (Simcheong, yeonkkot-ui gil 2007)
 Princess Bari (2007)
 Evening Star (Gaebapbaragibyeol 2008)
 Gangnam Dream (Gangnammong 2010)
 A Familiar Life (Natikeun sesang 2011)
 Sound of the Rapids (Yeoulmul sori 2012)
 At Dusk (Haejil Muryeop 2015)

Multi-volume saga,
 Jang Gilsan (Jang Gilsan'' 1974-1984)

Awards
 Manhae Literary Prize (1989)
 Danjae Literary Prize (2000)
 Isan Literary Prize (2000)
 Daesan Literature Prize (2001, for The Guest)
 Manhae Literary Award Grand Prize (2004)
 Korea Culture and Arts Foundation 'This Year's' Art Prize (2004)
 Mark of Respect Award (2008)
 Prix Emile-Guimet (2018).

See also
List of Koreans
Korean literature
List of Korean novelists

References

External links
English translation of the opening of The Old Garden
Online translation of Camel's Eye
Online extracts of The Guest
The Guest
The Old Garden

1943 births
Living people
Writers from Changchun
Korean people of Manchukuo
Changwon Hwang clan
South Korean democracy activists
South Korean expatriates in Germany
South Korean expatriates in Vietnam
South Korean novelists
South Korean prisoners and detainees
Republic of Korea Marine Corps personnel
Korean military personnel of the Vietnam War
Dongguk University alumni